The 2022–23 Abilene Christian Wildcats men's basketball team represented Abilene Christian University in the 2022–23 NCAA Division I men's basketball season. The Wildcats, led by second-year head coach Brette Tanner, played their home games at Moody Coliseum in Abilene, Texas as members of the Western Athletic Conference.

Previous season
The Wildcats finished the 2021–22 season 25–11, 11–7 in WAC play to finish in sixth place. They defeated Utah Valley, upset Stephen F. Austin and Seattle to advance to the championship game of the WAC tournament. They would lose to top-seeded New Mexico State in the title game. They were invited to the CBI, where they would defeat Troy and Ohio, before falling to Middle Tennessee in the semifinals.

Roster

Schedule and results

|-
!colspan=12 style=| Non-conference regular season

|-
!colspan=12 style=| WAC regular season

|-
!colspan=9 style=| WAC tournament

|-

Sources

References

Abilene Christian Wildcats men's basketball seasons
Abilene Christian Wildcats
Abilene Christian Wildcats men's basketball
Abilene Christian Wildcats men's basketball